Maximiliano 'Maxi' Daniel Pérez Tambasco (born October 26, 1986 in Buenos Aires) is an Argentine-born Uruguayan footballer who plays as a striker for Wanderers.

External links
 BDFA profile
 Maximiliano Pérez at Soccerway

1986 births
Living people
Footballers from Buenos Aires
Argentine footballers
Uruguayan footballers
Association football forwards
Centro Atlético Fénix players
Defensor Sporting players
Peñarol players
Rosario Central footballers
San Martín de San Juan footballers
Rangers de Talca footballers
Everton de Viña del Mar footballers
Club Necaxa footballers
CD Tenerife players
Olimpo footballers
Montevideo Wanderers F.C. players
Argentine Primera División players
Primera Nacional players
Uruguayan Primera División players
Chilean Primera División players
Segunda División players
Ascenso MX players
Expatriate footballers in Chile
Expatriate footballers in Argentina
Expatriate footballers in Uruguay
Expatriate footballers in Spain
Expatriate footballers in Mexico
Argentine emigrants to Uruguay
Naturalized citizens of Uruguay